Toma Caragiu ((21 August 1925 – 4 March 1977) was a prolific Greek-born Romanian theatre, television and film actor.

He was born in an Aromanian family from the village of Chroupista (since 1926 renamed Argos Orestiko) in the region of Macedonia in Greece on 21 August 1925. Toma Caragiu was one of the best-known Romanian actors, with a rich activity in both film and theatre. He liked to play comic characters, but he excelled also in drama, one of his reference films being "Actorul şi Sǎlbaticii".  He played alongside great actors such as Ştefan Bănică, Octavian Cotescu, Anda Călugăreanu etc.

Toma Caragiu is most famous for his monologues. In these short stories, he managed to put together stories that combined sarcasm, satire and black humor. His monologues were subtle and dealt with a variety of topics, starting with politics and ending up with mythical concepts. In each and every monologue he added a personal touch to the script, thus creating a warm and humorous atmosphere.

He died in Bucharest, during the earthquake of 4 March 1977. He is buried at Bellu Cemetery. His first wife was the actress Maria Bondar and the second one was Elena Bichman.

Partial filmography 

 Nufărul roşu (1956, directed by Gheorghe Tobias)
 Nu vreau sa ma însor (1961)
 Vară romantică (1961, directed by Sinisa Ivetici)
 Străzile au amintiri (1962, directed by Manole Marcus) - Comiserul
 Poveste sentimentală (1962, directed by Iulian Mihu) - Ioachim
  (1963, directed by Haralambie Boroș)
 Cartierul veseliei (1965, directed by Manole Marcus) - Gheorghe Gheorghe
 Forest of the Hanged (1965) - Habsburg officer
 Procesul alb (1966, directed by Iulian Mihu)
 Haiducii (1966) - Haiducul Raspopitul
 Vremea zăpezilor (1966, directed by Gheorghe Naghi)
 Subteranul (1967, directed by Virgil Calotescu) - Florescu
 Șeful sectorului suflete (1967) - Horatiu
 Răpirea fecioarelor (1968, directed by Dinu Cocea) - haiducul Raspopitul
 Răzbunarea haiducilor (1968) - Raspopitul
 KO (1968, directed by Mircea Mureșan) - Olympian
 Brigada Diverse intră în acțiune (1970) - Capitanul Panait
 B.D. în alerta - Profesorul de mimica (1970) - IMDb Capitanul Panait
 Haiducii lui Șaptecai (1971) - Raspopitul
 Zestrea domniței Ralu (1971) - Raspotitu
 Brigada Diverse în alertă! (1971) - Capitanul Panait
 B.D. la munte și la mare (1971) - Captain Panait
 Săptămîna nebunilor (1971) - Raspopitu
 Facerea lumii (1971, directed by Gheorghe Vitanidis) - {{lang}|ro|afaceristul Marinescu}}
 B.D. în alerta - Vaduve cu termen redus (1971) - Capitanul Panait
 Bariera (1972, directed by Mircea Mureșan) - {{lang}|ro|italic=no|seful de post de jandarmi Iftimie}}
 Ciprian Porumbescu (1973) - The Colonel
 Explozia (1973, directed by Mircea Drăgan) - Corbea
 {{lang}|ro|Trei scrisori secrete}} (1974, directed by Virgil Calotescu)
 Dragostea începe vineri (1974)
 Tatăl risipitor (1974, directed by Adrian Petringenaru) - Oaie
 Proprietarii (1974, directed by Șerban Creangă)
 Nu filmăm să ne-amuzăm (1974)
 Actorul și sălbaticii (1975) - Costica Caratase
 Mastodontul (1975, directed by Virgil Calotescu) - Gogan
 Singurătatea florilor (1976) - taximetristul Grigore Pascu
 Dincolo de pod (1976)
 Operațiunea Monstrul (1976) - {{lang}|ro|italic=no|directorul Dumitru}}
 Serenada pentru etajul XII (1976, directed by Carol Corfanta) - Retired Worker Firu
 Premiera (1976) - Titi Precup
 Gloria nu cântă (1976, directed by Alexandru Bocăneț)
 {{lang}|ro|Casa de la miezul noptii}} (1976)
 Condiția Penelopei (1976, directed by Luminița Cazacu)
 Buzduganul cu trei peceți (1977, directed by Constantin Vaeni) - Pamfilie / Popa Traista
 Marele singuratic (1977)
 Tufǎ de Veneția (1977, directed by Petre Bokor) - (final film role)

References

External links
 

1925 births
1977 deaths
Romanian people of Aromanian descent
Aromanian actors
Romanian comedians
Romanian male film actors
Romanian male stage actors
Romanian television personalities
Victims of the 1977 Vrancea earthquake
Burials at Bellu Cemetery
Greek emigrants to Romania
20th-century Romanian male actors
20th-century comedians

People from Argos Orestiko